This is a list of members of the 19th Bundestag – the lower house of parliament of the Federal Republic of Germany, whose members were in office from 24 October 2017 until 26 October 2021.


Members 
Constituencies and vote percentage are given for the members directly elected (first past the post) in the 299 Bundestag constituencies. The remaining members are elected via party lists in each state. Members who leave parliament are replaced by the next person on their party's state list.

Former members 
Several members have resigned or died in office.

See also
Politics of Germany
List of Bundestag Members

External links
 (official list of Bundestag members)

References

19